Wang Dalong (Chinese: 王大龙; born 11 March 1989 in Shenyang) is a Chinese football player who currently plays for Chinese club Dalian Duxing.

Club career
Wang Dalong would play for the join Dalian Railway Yiteng youth team and remained with them as they moved to Harbin while the club renamed themselves Harbin Yiteng. In 2007, Wang Dalong would be promoted to the senior team and start his professional footballer career with Harbin Yiteng in the China League One. Unfortunately the following season, Wang was part of the squad that was relegated to the third-tier at the end of the 2008 China League One campaign.

In the 2011 China League Two campaign, Wang would go on to establish himself as an integral member of the team that won the division and promotion back into the second tier. This would be followed by another promotion when the club came runners-up of the 2013 China League One division and gain promotion to the top tier for the first time in the club's history. In the top tier, Wang would make his Chinese Super League debut for Harbin on 7 March 2014 in a game against Shandong Luneng Taishan that ended in a 1-0 defeat. After the game the team struggled within the league and were relegated at the end of the 2014 Chinese Super League season.

On 4 January 2017, Wang moved to fellow League One side Shenzhen FC. He would make his debut for the club on 12 March 2017 in a league game against Dalian Transcendence F.C. that ended in a 6-0 victory. The following season he would go on to aid the team gain promotion to the top tier when the club came runners-up within the league at the end of the 2018 China League One campaign.

In March 2020, Wang was loaned to China League one side Taizhou Yuanda. He would make his debut in a league game on 13 September 2020 against Suzhou Dongwu in a 1-0 victory.

Career statistics 
Statistics accurate as of match played 31 December 2020.

Honours

Club
Harbin Yiteng
 China League Two: 2011

References

External links
 

1989 births
Living people
Chinese footballers
Footballers from Shenyang
Zhejiang Yiteng F.C. players
Shenzhen F.C. players
Taizhou Yuanda F.C. players
Chinese Super League players
China League One players
Association football defenders
Guangxi Pingguo Haliao F.C. players